The Border Cavalier is a 1927 American silent Western film directed by William Wyler and written by Basil Dickey and Gardner Bradford. The film stars Fred Humes, Evelyn Peirce, C.E. Anderson, William Barrymore, Joyce Compton, and Dick La Reno. The film was released on September 18, 1927, by Universal Pictures.

Cast   
 Fred Humes as Larry Day
 Evelyn Peirce as Anne Martin
 C.E. Anderson as Beaver Martin
 William Barrymore as Victor Harding 
 Joyce Compton as Madge Lawton
 Dick La Reno as Dave Lawton
 Richard L'Estrange as Lazy 
 Gilbert Holmes as Pee Wee
 Ben Corbett as Bennie
 Scotty Mattraw

References

External links

 
 

1927 films
1927 Western (genre) films
Universal Pictures films
Films directed by William Wyler
American black-and-white films
Silent American Western (genre) films
1920s English-language films
1920s American films